Usta alba is a species of moth in the family Saturniidae. It is found in Tanzania.

Taxonomy
Usta alba is treated as a subspecies or synonym of Usta terpsichore by some sources.

References

Endemic fauna of Tanzania
Moths described in 1991
alba
Insects of Tanzania
Moths of Africa